Papakura City FC is a New Zealand football (soccer) club based in Papakura, Auckland, New Zealand. The club currently competes in the AFF/NFF Conference. The club also fields teams in all junior divisions, as well as a Women's team that competes in the Lotto NRFL Women's Premier League. Papakura play their home games at McLennan Park, Papakura.

Club history
The club was founded in 1959, and is based at McLennan Park, Papakura. Papakura City was the first club to be coached by future All Whites national coach Ricki Herbert. Papakura City's best performance in the Chatham Cup was a quarter-final appearance in 2005. The men's squad contains several ex and current international players including Junior Bukalidi (Fiji), Apisai Smith (Fiji), Valerio Nawatu (Fiji), Nicholas Lawrence (Fiji), Daniel Billot (NZ U20's) and Harry Hillary-Jenkins (PNG). Ex-club members who have gone on to higher honours include Tim Payne (current Blackburn Rovers (English NPower Championship) and All Whites), Thomas Spragg (NZ U-17 and U-20).  Current club membership stands at 815, with 64 teams covering all age groups (junior and youth - boys and girls, senior men, senior women).

External links
Auckland Football Federation Papakura City page
club website

Association football clubs in Auckland
1959 establishments in New Zealand